MŠK Spišské Podhradie is a Slovak football team, based in the town of Spišské Podhradie. The club it plays in 4. liga (4th level).

Colors and badge 
red and blue

External links 
at futbalvsfz.sk

References

Spisske Podhradie